The EL84 is a vacuum tube of the power pentode type. It is used in the power-output-stages of audio-amplifiers, most commonly now in guitar amplifiers, but originally in radios. The EL84 is smaller and more sensitive than the octal 6V6 that was widely used around the world until the 1960s. An interchangeable North American type is the 6BQ5 (the RETMA tube designation name for the EL84).

The EL84 was developed to eliminate the need for a driver tube in radios, so it has rather more gain than is usual in a power pentode. Eliminating  a preamplifier triode in radios made them cheaper. Manufacturers were quick to adopt it in general use, and they are found in many old European tube-radios and other audio equipment. A single EL84 was used in low-cost equipment, and a push–pull pair for lower distortion and higher power.

In common with all 'E' prefix tubes, using the Mullard–Philips tube designation, it has a heater voltage of 6.3V. It can produce 17W output in Class AB1 in push–pull configuration. Many guitar-amplifiers routinely run EL84 tubes in excess of 400VDC, with the Traynor Guitarmate reportedly putting out 25W RMS with 2 EL84s in a push–pull configuration and a B+ between 400-420 VDC.

Developed by Philips in 1953, and used in the British Mullard 5-10 amplifier circuit, the EL84 came to prominence when used in Watkins (and later the Vox) amplifiers preferred by many British Invasion bands of the 1960s.

N709, 6BQ5/EL84/6P15, and other exact equivalents
The 1959 "Miniwatt" Technical Data book from Philips lists the 6BQ5 as the R.E.T.M.A. (American) name for the EL84 in its "Type Number Cross Reference", and hence an exact substitute. American and Japanese manufacturers might label their versions of the EL84 as "EL84/6BQ5" or "6BQ5/EL84" or simply "6BQ5" Other manufacturers followed with their versions, such as the N709 from General Electric Co. Ltd. of England and the 6P15 from UK brand Mazda, that were designed to be "drop-in" substitutes.  The CV2975 is the military designation (Common Tube) for EL84.

Other equivalent tubes are the 7189 and 7189A, an extended-ratings version of the tube for industrial applications, E84L (7320) long life, professional version with more than 10000 hours expected lifetime and the directly equivalent 6P14P (Cyrillic: 6П14П) produced in the USSR by the Reflektor plant.   a slightly modified version of the 6P14P was manufactured in Russia for Sovtek.  An extended-ratings version of the 6P14P is also available - 6P14P-EV (Cyrillic: 6П14П-ЕВ) and is known among US guitar players as "EL84M" or the "Russian military EL84".  While not necessarily a true "military version" of the tube (in fact it is more comparable to the 7189), 6P14P-EVs are known for their low noise and durability.  Large NOS (New Old Stock) supplies of the tube are available.
The 6GK6 has nearly equivalent operating characteristics with a different pinout.

 the tube was manufactured in Russia (Sovtek, Electro-Harmonix, Tung-Sol, Mullard and Genalex Gold Lion brands), Slovakia- Čadca (JJ Electronic) and China (Psvane brand made by Hengyang Electronics). The Sovtek EL84 is often sold under their own brand name by other well-known electric guitar and guitar amplifier manufacturers - such as Fender or Mesa Boogie.

Also see 6P1P.

PL84, UL84, and EL86
Although RCA and Sylvania produced the 8BQ5 and 10BQ5 as exact equivalents to the 6BQ5/EL84 other than heater voltage/current, most variants of the EL84 (e.g. the 15CW5/PL84) for series-heater applications such as television receivers (where it was most economical to directly-rectify the mains) made slight changes to the geometry of the original EL84 design to optimise performance for the slightly lower power supply voltages. When a 6.3V heater version of the PL84 was needed, the type number EL86 was assigned; the EL86 and PL84 are therefore very similar to, but not exactly identical to, the original EL84.

Characteristics
Note: Specifications given for the EL84, PL84, and UL84 are from Philips;  RCA and Sylvania list slightly higher voltage ratings for Va and Vkf and lower for Vg2 for the xCW5 series - the 6CW5/EL86, 8CW5/XL86, 10CW5/LL86, 15CW5/PL84, and 30CW5/HL84.

References

External links
  - EL84 data at TDSL.
 Vacuum tube datasheet archive
 Reviews of EL84/6bq5 tubes.

See also
 List of vacuum tubes

Vacuum tubes
Guitar amplification tubes